Diphlebia lestoides is a species of Australian damselfly in the family Lestoideidae,
commonly known as a whitewater rockmaster. 
It is endemic to south-eastern Australia, where it inhabits streams and rivers.

Diphlebia lestoides is a large, solid-looking damselfly; the male is a blue to grey colour with black markings, while the female has a more muted colouring. It sits with its white marked wings spread out.

Gallery

See also
 List of Odonata species of Australia

References 

Lestoideidae
Odonata of Australia
Insects of Australia
Endemic fauna of Australia
Taxa named by Edmond de Sélys Longchamps
Insects described in 1853
Damselflies